Mormon Enigma: Emma Hale Smith, Prophet's Wife, "Elect Lady," Polygamy's Foe is a biography of Emma Hale Smith, wife of Joseph Smith Jr., written by Linda King Newell and Valeen Tippetts Avery.

Generally accepted as a groundbreaking biography, the book places Emma Smith into a context that has better explained the trials and sacrifices of the members of the early Latter Day Saint church.  The work made possible, along with other more recent historical works, a major reinterpretation of the formative period of Mormonism.

The book won the 1984 Best Book Award for interpretive history by the Mormon History Association.

Avery and Newell provided the following note in the book's introduction:

Despite its quality and recognition, the biography was startling and controversial among leaders, administrators and members of The Church of Jesus Christ of Latter-day Saints. Shortly after publication, Avery and Newell, both participating members in the church, were refused any opportunity to talk about their research or book in church meetings. In the preface to the second edition of the book, the authors wrote: "After a ten-months stalemate Linda Newell successfully petitioned church leaders to reconsider the prohibition. On April 26, 1986, she was informed that the restrictions ... were no longer in effect." Yet the fact that the lifting of that ban was not reported by the church-owned newspaper Deseret News led them to say that it "gave the unmistakable message to faithful church members that both the book and its authors were still suspect."

Publication information 
  Newell, Linda King and Avery, Valeen T. Mormon Enigma: Emma Hale Smith, Prophet's Wife, Elect Lady, Polygamy's Foe.  Doubleday Publishing, September 1984.  .  2nd edition. rev., Urbana, IL: University of Illinois Press, 1994.

Notes

References
. Discusses the religious controversy following Mormon Enigma's initial publication in 1984 (page 40 to 48).

External links
 

1984 non-fiction books
1984 in Christianity
American biographies
Doubleday (publisher) books
English-language books
History books about the Latter Day Saint movement
Joseph Smith